A Year in Provence is a 1989 best-selling memoir by Peter Mayle about his first year in Provence, and the local events and customs. It was adapted into a television series starring John Thaw and Lindsay Duncan. Reviewers praised the book's honest style, wit and its refreshing humour.

Plot
Peter Mayle and his wife move to Provence, and are soon met with unexpectedly fierce weather, underground truffle dealers and unruly workers, who work around their normalement schedule. Meals in Provençal restaurants and work on the Mayles' house, garden and vineyard are features of the book, whose chapters follow the months of the year.

Adaptations
In 1991 a radio adaptation was broadcast on BBC Radio 4.

In 1993, the BBC produced a television series based on the book, starring Lindsay Duncan and John Thaw, with appearances from Alfred Molina and James Fleet. Unlike the book, the programme was not well received by critics and it was later placed at number ten on a Radio Times list of the worst television programmes ever made with John Naughton, describing it as a "smugathon ... which achieved the near impossible – creating a John Thaw vehicle nobody liked".

Sequels
Toujours Provence (1991)
Encore Provence (1999)
French Lessons (2001)

Cultural influence 
Mayle's memoir provided inspiration for the 2008 satirical novel A Year in the Province by Christopher Marsh in which an Andalusian man persuades his wife and his three daughters to relocate to Belfast.

References

External links

1989 non-fiction books
British travel books
Books about France
English non-fiction books
Non-fiction books adapted into television shows
Television shows based on non-fiction books
BBC television dramas
1993 British television series debuts
1993 British television series endings
1990s British drama television series
English-language television shows
Peter Mayle
Hamish Hamilton books